Greatest Misses is a compilation album of songs by American new wave band Devo, released in 1990 by Warner Bros. Records. Greatest Misses contains lesser-known tracks and alternate versions of tracks from other albums. It has a Parental Advisory label because of the song "Penetration in the Centrefold".

The album booklet includes several photos from previous albums, and the second half of an article on the band by Howie Klein for BAM magazine. The first half of this article appears in the booklet for Devo's Greatest Hits.

Track listing

 Although "Be Stiff" and "Jocko Homo" are labeled as being the original Booji Boy Records single versions, they are not. "Be Stiff" is the official studio recording, produced by Brian Eno and originally issued on a Stiff Records single, later reissued on the B Stiff EP (1977). "Jocko Homo" is the original demo version featured in the short film The Truth About De-Evolution (1976), later reissued on Hardcore Devo: Volume One (1990).

Personnel 
Devo
Bob Casale – rhythm guitar, keyboards, vocals
Gerald Casale – vocals, bass guitar, keyboards
Bob Mothersbaugh – lead guitar, vocals
Mark Mothersbaugh – vocals, keyboards, guitar
Alan Myers – drums

Technical
Brian Eno – producer (4, 7–11, 15b)
Devo – producer (13, 16)
Roy Thomas Baker – producer (14)
Ken Scott – producer, engineer (1–3, 5, 6, 12, 15a)
Kathe Duba-Noland – album compilation
Gerald Casale – album compilation, art devotion
Mark Mothersbaugh – album compilation
Tim Stedman – art devotion
Alex Remlyn – devography
Howie Klein – liner notes
Erik Arnesen – photography
Bobbi Watson – photography
Moshe Brakha – photography

References

Devo compilation albums
1990 compilation albums
Warner Records compilation albums